

The Farman F.370 was a French single-seat racing monoplane designed and built by the Farman Aviation Works for air racing.

Development
The F.370 was a low-wing monoplane that first flew on the 22 April 1933. Powered by a Farman 8 Vee-piston engine it had streamlined features, including a shallow fin faired into the open cockpit headrest and fixed main monowheel landing gear faired into the engine and oil radiators of the engine. It was entered into the 1933 Coupe Deutsch de la Meurthe air race in which it averaged over 300 km/h (187 mph), on the fifth circuit the engine overheated and the F.370 withdrew from the race.

Specifications (F.370)

References

Notes

Bibliography

1930s French sport aircraft
F.370
Single-engined tractor aircraft
Low-wing aircraft
Aircraft first flown in 1933